Hire or HIRE may refer to:

 Employment
 Rental or Equipment rental
Payment for the use of a ship under a time charter
 Hire (surname)
 Hire (Messenia), a town of ancient Messenia, Greece
 Hire, Nebraska, a community in the United States
 Hire Township, McDonough County, Illinois, a township in the United States
 Hiré, a town in the Ivory Coast
 Hiring Incentives to Restore Employment Act, a United States law enacted in 2010
The Hire, short film series

See also
Haier, Chinese home appliances and electronics company
Hires (disambiguation)